John G. Duman is the Gillen Professor of Biological Sciences at the University of Notre Dame in South Bend, Indiana in the area of environmental physiology with particular focus on freeze avoidance and freeze tolerance in insects. He joined the faculty at Notre Dame in 1974 following the completion of his doctorate in marine biology at the Scripps Institution of Oceanography at University of California, San Diego under Arthur L. DeVries.  Duman served as Assistant Dean in 1982-1987 and subsequently as Associate Dean for the Notre Dame College of Science beginning in 1987-1993 until his tenure as Chair of the Department of Biological Sciences from 1993-2002.

References 

University of Notre Dame faculty
21st-century American biologists
Year of birth missing (living people)
Living people